Angelique Frances Meunier (born 14 February 1985), known professionally as Havana Brown or DJ Havana Brown, is an Australian DJ, singer, record producer, songwriter and dancer. In 2008, Brown signed with Island Records Australia as a DJ for the record company, and began releasing her Crave compilation album series, which featured remixes of songs from other artists. This led to her touring with international artists, including Britney Spears, Rihanna, the Pussycat Dolls, Chris Brown and Enrique Iglesias.

Brown made her debut as a recording artist in 2011, with the single "We Run the Night", which reached number five on the Australian ARIA Singles Chart and was certified triple platinum by the Australian Recording Industry Association (ARIA). The single earned Brown two ARIA Music Award nominations for Breakthrough Artist Single and Highest Selling Single. Following this success, Brown signed a US record deal with Universal Republic via producer RedOne's label 2101 Records. A remix of "We Run the Night", featuring American rapper Pitbull, was produced by RedOne and released in the United States. It reached number one on the US Hot Dance Club Songs chart and number 26 on the US Billboard Hot 100 chart. The remix was included on Brown's first EP, When the Lights Go Out, which was released in July 2012. Brown was also one of the contestants in the second season of the Australian version of the TV series I'm a Celebrity...Get Me Out of Here! in 2016, where she came 6th.

Brown has been engaged to her Manager Vince Deltito since 2015. Deltito was a child star on Australian variety program Young Talent Time for six years from the age of 11.

Life and career

Early life and career beginnings 
Brown was born in Melbourne, Australia to Mauritian parents of French descent from the island of Rodrigues and grew in both Australia and Rodrigues, which she used to visit frequently. Before she started to DJ, she was signed to a record label in the United Kingdom with a group called Fishbowl. They were about to release their first single under the label, but the group fell apart and Brown turned to DJing. She then began performing at venues around Melbourne and worked with promotions around Australia.

2008–09: Crave and touring 
In 2008, Brown signed to Island Records Australia, after being approached by a boss of the label, who asked her if she was interested in doing a compilation album. She has since been releasing her Crave compilation series through the label. In October 2008, Brown supported Rihanna on the Australian leg of her Good Girl Gone Bad Tour. In May 2009, she served as a support act for the Pussycat Dolls during the Australian leg of their Doll Domination Tour. Brown also supported Britney Spears during the European leg of her 2009 Circus Tour. She earned the same support role for the Australian leg of the tour in November 2009.

Since December 2009, Brown has provided mixes every Saturday night on Party People, a radio show which broadcasts across Australia by the Today Network.

2011–2013: Breakthrough and When The Lights Go Out

In April 2011, Brown was a supporting act for Chris Brown's Australian leg of his F.A.M.E. Tour. On 29 April 2011, Brown released her debut single "We Run the Night", which was written and produced by Cassie Davis and Snob Scrilla of the production duo More Mega. The song peaked at number five on the ARIA Singles Chart and was certified triple platinum by the Australian Recording Industry Association (ARIA), for selling 210,000 copies. On 4 September 2011, Brown told The Daily Telegraph that she had signed a US recording contract with Universal Republic Records via producer RedOne's label 2101 Records. The official remix of "We Run the Night", featuring additional production by RedOne and a rap verse by American rapper Pitbull, was released in the United States on 27 September 2011. It peaked at number one on the US Hot Dance Club Songs chart. Brown's second single "Get It" was released on 9 September 2011, and peaked at number 38 on the ARIA Singles Chart. On 20 April 2012, Brown released a promotional single titled "City of Darkness".

Brown's debut EP When the Lights Go Out was released on 17 July 2012. The Australian version of the EP included five new songs, while the US version included the RedOne remix of "We Run the Night". On 18 July 2012, she appeared as a musical guest on America's Got Talent. In August 2012, Brown became a supporting act, alongside Timomatic and Taio Cruz, for Pitbull's Australian leg of his Planet Pit World Tour. Brown represented Australia at the first ABU TV Song Festival 2012, which took place at the KBS Concert Hall in Seoul, South Korea on 14 October 2012.
"Big Banana", featuring R3hab and Prophet of 7Lions, was released as the third single from When the Lights Go Out on 4 December 2012. It was Brown's second single to peak at number one on the US Hot Dance Club Songs chart. It also peaked at number 15 on the US Dance/Electronic Songs chart. In Australia, "Big Banana" peaked at number 18 on the ARIA Singles Chart, and at number 2 on the ARIA Dance Singles Chart. The song was certified gold by the Australian Recording Industry Association (ARIA), denoting sales of 70,000 copies.
"Spread a Little Love" was released as the fourth single from the EP but failed to chart.

2013–present: Flashing Lights and subsequent releases
Brown's debut studio album Flashing Lights was released on 11 October 2013, which debuted at number six on the ARIA Albums Chart. It features collaborations with RedOne, R3hab, Cassie Davis, Snob Scrilla and Afrojack. Flashing Lights also features previously released tracks "We Run the Night", "Big Banana" and "You'll Be Mine". The album was in the process of creation from 2011 when she released "We Run the Night", which sold over one million copies in the United States and charted across the globe. Brown spent 2012 and 2013 primarily based in the U.S. working on the album. The lead single "Flashing Lights" was released on 23 August 2013 and peaked at number 68 on the ARIA Singles Chart. "Flashing Lights" peaked at number one on the Hot Dance Club Songs chart marking her third number one in the US on that chart. The second single "Warrior" was released on 27 September 2013, debuted at number 32 before peaking at number 11 and was certified platinum for sales of over 70,000 copies. On 14 October 2013, Brown performed "Warrior" on season five of The X Factor Australia.

On 27 March 2014, Brown released the single "Whatever We Want", which peaked at number 35 on the ARIA Singles Chart. Brown's next single "Better Not Said" was released on 9 September 2014, and peaked at number 79. In January 2015, she released her eleventh lead single "No Ordinary Love", which is a dance version of Sade's song of the same name.

On 24 July 2015, Brown released her new single entitled "Battle Cry", featuring guest vocals from Bebe Rexha and Savi.

In 2018, Brown released the Hip hop influenced single "Glimpse" (feat. Rich the Kid). The single was originally the lead single from her then upcoming EP. "Cookie" (feat. Veronica Vega) released on May 10, 2019, as the second single from the then upcoming EP. However the EP was scrapped due to damage to the original masters.

On 18 October 2019, Brown released the single "All Day", which has Pop music and R&B influenced sound.

Influences
Brown claimed Janet Jackson as her biggest influence, stating "she's my idol" and "I want to be Janet Jackson! But the DJ-slash-Janet Jackson—I want to be able to put on big shows, I want dancers, I want fireworks, I want it all."

Discography 

Studio albums
Flashing Lights (2013)

EPs
When the Lights Go Out (2012)

Tours 
Headlining
Oz Tour (2013–14)

Supporting act
Rihanna's Good Girl Gone Bad Tour: Australian leg (2008)
The Pussycat Dolls Doll Domination Tour: Australian leg (2009)
Britney Spears's Circus Tour: Europe and Australia legs (select dates) (2009)
Chris Brown's F.A.M.E. Tour: Australian leg (2011)
Enrique Iglesias's Euphoria Tour: Australian leg (2011)
Pitbull's Planet Pit World Tour: Australian leg (2012)
Bruno Mars's The Moonshine Jungle Tour: Las Vegas (2014)

Awards and nominations

References

External links 
 
 
 
 
 
 

1985 births
21st-century Australian singers
Living people
Singers from Melbourne
People from Rodrigues
Australian DJs
Mauritian DJs
Women DJs
Australian dance musicians
Australian house musicians
Mauritian people of French descent
Australian people of Mauritian descent
Australian people of French descent
Synth-pop musicians
Australian women pop singers
Electronic dance music DJs
21st-century Australian women singers
Mauritian singers
I'm a Celebrity...Get Me Out of Here! (Australian TV series) participants